The 2017 V de V Proto Endurance Series was the sixteenth consecutive season for the Group CN based series sanctioned by V de V Sports.

Entry list

CN A

Race calendar and results
Bold indicates overall winner.

References
 

V de V Proto Endurance Challenge